Punk & Poetry is the third album by The King Blues. It was released on 17 April 2011 on digital download, and on CD the following day. The track listing for the album was released on 5 March 2011 on their website, and featured the previously released "Headbutt" single, which reached number 72 upon release in May 2010. "We Are Fucking Angry" was made available as a free to download on 27 January 2011. Their second single off the album, "Set the World on Fire" got its first play on Mike Davies Radio 1 punk show on 8 February 2011, and was announced that it would be released on 10 April 2011. Itch announced on both Facebook and Twitter that 'I Want You' would be released as the third single.

Punk & Poetry entered the UK Albums Chart at number 31.

Album themes

In a podcast with Kerrang!, Jamie Jazz & Jonny 'Itch' Fox go through the album track by track, explaining what each song is about. Itch explains that the opening track "Last of the Dreamers" is "a call out for all the people unspoken for". The next song, "We Are Fucking Angry" which is the lead single from the album (which has become a popular anarchist slogan), Itch tells that the song was written after seeing the student protests, which was made to "blare out of our sound system", and they wanted "a full on, in your face, punchy kind of punk rock track".

The third song off the album, "Set the World on Fire", Itch says the song is "not accepting that the convenience of modern life is necessarily a good thing, or honest way to live, but questioning it, and questioning how we've got to a point where in some places in the world, they're making these things for us, and here we just use them and spending them freely". Jamie Jazz adds "Musically, when we first wrote it, it was an out and out hardcore track, it was nice to get it into the studio and take that rawness and break it down a little bit, pull it apart and put it back together, and I think it's a much better song now". "Dancehall", according to Itch is "about living your life as a celebration really". "The Future's Not What It Used to Be" is about how the generation now are told they can't enjoy life as much as previous generations, and have been put in an unfair scenario because of a previous generations mistakes. Itch explains that "it's about hoping that kids can hear it and realise that although it seems doom & gloom, the answers lie with them and the power lies with kids, the power to change their lives and transform their lives, be whoever they want to be is down to them at the end of the day".

The next song, "I Want You" was made because "we wanted to write a buzzcock, fun, 70s pop punk song, and that's what we did", according to Jamie.

Track listing

Note: All songs written by Jonny 'Itch' Fox, except "We Are Fucking Angry" which was written by Jonny 'Itch' Fox and Peter Miles.

Editions
 A Standard CD
 A HMV Exclusive Special Edition. This featured a music-pin code that allowed the purchaser the option to downloaded additional live versions, wallpapers and a video of the track "Headbutt".
 iTunes LP

Personnel
 Jonny 'Itch' Fox – Lead vocals, ukulele
 Jamie Jazz – Guitar, backing vocals
 Peter Miles – Programming, bass, guitar, percussion, synths
 Dean Ashton – Bass, backing vocals, keyboards, guitar
 Luke Leighfield – Piano, Hammond
 Jack Usher – Drums, percussion, backing vocals
 Kat Marsh – Backing vocals, bass
 Josh Waters Rudge – Guitar
 Marcia Richards – Flute, Hammond, keyboards, piano
 George Lindsay – Drums
 Josie Dobson – Piano
 Alex White – Piano
 Will Harvey – Violin
 Charlie Rusbridger – Cello
 The King Blues Choir – Gang vocals

Chart performance

Charting singles

References

External links 
 Review at BBC Music

2011 albums
The King Blues albums
British punk music